The Copán Bench Panel or Copan Bench Panel is the name of a sculpted platform that was originally located in Temple 11 at the Maya site of Copán in Honduras. Discovered by the English archaeologist Alfred Maudslay in the late nineteenth century, it now forms part of the British Museum's extensive collection of ancient artefacts from Central America. Dated to the late 8th Century AD, the panel is both a work of art and a significant historical record of royal authority.

Description
The stone bench is composed of two long panels that when aligned together are over 5 metres in length.  Both panels depict twenty seated individuals, split into two groups of ten facing each other, between which is engraved a central panel with hieroglyphic text. The scene portrayed on this enormous sculpture is thought to depict King Yax-Pac's accession to the throne, overseen by his ancestors from previous dynasties. Yax-pac is shown seated to the right of the central text; it is conjectured that the deceased kings' presence helped to justify his claim to the royal throne. The iconography of the bench panel is very similar to the famous Copán Altar Q.

Provenance

Maudslay found this bench panel in pieces above a raised platform inside Temple 11 at Copán in 1881. He shipped it to England along with a number of other sculptures from the site and later donated most of his collection to the Victoria and Albert Museum, which in turn transferred Maudslay's original sculptures and extensive range of casts to the British Museum in 1923.

See also
Yaxchilan Lintel 24
Fenton Vase
Tulum Stela 1

Bibliography
M. Coe, Breaking the Maya code (London, Thames & Hudson, 1992)
L. Schele and M.E. Miller, The blood of kings (London, Thames & Hudson, 1986)
 M. Coe and J. Kerr, The art of the Maya scribe (London, Thames & Hudson, 1997)

References

 
Maya inscriptions
Mesoamerican artifacts
Ethnographic objects in the British Museum
Artefacts from Africa, Oceania and the Americas in the British Museum
Copán
King lists
Mesoamerican stone sculpture
8th-century inscriptions
Sculptures of the British Museum
Honduras–United Kingdom relations